Mattia Bonetti (born 1952) is a Paris-based artist and designer. Bonetti was born in Lugano, Switzerland, and studied textile design at the Centro Scolastico per l’Industria Artistica. Bonetti moved from Switzerland to Paris, where he now lives and works. Prior to designing furniture, Bonetti worked as a stylist and photographer. In 1979 he began designing furniture. All of his work begins as a freehand sketch which is then fabricated. Bonetti has worked with the same fabricators for decades, employing craftsmen to make transform his drawings.

For the booth of Paul Kasmin Gallery at the 2015 edition of TEFAF Maastricht, Bonetti was responsible for the design of the entire display, which also included the wooden floors, upholstered chairs, and tables, and designed wallpaper based on one of his watercolors.

Selected solo exhibitions 
2017: "New Works," David Gill Gallery, London (June, upcoming)
2014: "New Works," David Gill Gallery, London
2013: "Indoor, Outdoor," Paul Kasmin Gallery, New York
2012: "New Works," David Gill Gallery, London
2011: Duke & Duke, Los Angeles
2010: "New York," Paul Kasmin Gallery, New York
2008: "New Works," David Gill Gallery, London
2008: Galerie Cat-Berros, Paris
2004: "New Works," David Gill Gallery, London

Public collections 
Mattia Bonetti's work is included in the collections of the Le Centre Georges Pompidou, Paris; Musée des Arts Décoratifs, Paris; Seibu Museum, Tokyo; Kunstmuseum, Düsseldorf, Germany; Le Grand Hornu, Belgium; Cooper-Hewitt Museum, New York, the Museum of Carcassonne, among many others.

Selected press 
Wyma, Chloe, "'I Refuse to Classify': Mattia Bonetti on Blurring Boundaries in Design," ArtInfo, 04/15/13.
Zara, Janelle, "Artist-Designer Equivocally Launches a New Collection at Paul Kasmin," ArtInfo, 04/03/13.
Green, Penelope, "Mattia Bonetti's Loud Furniture," The New York Times, 02/17/13.
'Lucia Van der Post, Mattia of Importance, Financial Times, June 5, 2012.
Nicole Swengley, Mattia Bonetti at David Gill, Financial Times, How to Spend It, June 25, 2014.

References

Swiss contemporary artists
1952 births
Living people
People from Lugano